Vladimir Blaževski (born 3 June 1955) is a Macedonian film director and screenwriter.

Best known for his documentaries, Blaževski made several acclaimed feature films as well, including Hi-Fi, which won him the Golden Arena for Best Director at the Yugoslav Film Awards in 1987, and Punk's Not Dead which was selected as the Macedonian entry for the Best Foreign Language Film at the 84th Academy Awards, without making the final shortlist.

References

External links

1955 births
Living people
Macedonian film directors
Macedonian screenwriters
Golden Arena for Best Director winners
People from Skopje
Yugoslav film directors